"Non è l'inferno" (English: This isn't hell) is a song recorded by Italian singer Emma. Written by Francesco Silvestre, Enrico Palmasi and Luca Sala, the recording was produced by Palmasi.

It was released on 15 February 2012 by Marrone's record label Universal Music as the third single of her second studio album Sarò libera (Sanremo Edition). She participated in the Sanremo Music Festival 2012 with the song and placed first.

Charts

Year-end charts

References 

2012 singles
2012 songs
Emma Marrone songs
Number-one singles in Italy
Sanremo Music Festival songs
Universal Music Group singles